The canton of Fontenay-Trésigny is an administrative division of the Seine-et-Marne department, in northern France. It was created at the French canton reorganisation which came into effect in March 2015. Its seat is in Fontenay-Trésigny.

It consists of the following communes: 

Bernay-Vilbert 
La Chapelle-Iger
Les Chapelles-Bourbon
Châtres
Chaumes-en-Brie
Coubert
Courpalay
Courquetaine
Crèvecœur-en-Brie
Dammartin-sur-Tigeaux
Évry-Grégy-sur-Yerre
Faremoutiers
Fontenay-Trésigny
Grisy-Suisnes
Guérard
La Houssaye-en-Brie
Limoges-Fourches
Lissy 
Liverdy-en-Brie
Lumigny-Nesles-Ormeaux
Marles-en-Brie
Mortcerf
Neufmoutiers-en-Brie
Ozouer-le-Voulgis
Pécy
Le Plessis-Feu-Aussoux
Pommeuse
Presles-en-Brie
Rozay-en-Brie
Soignolles-en-Brie
Solers
Vaudoy-en-Brie
Voinsles

References

Cantons of Seine-et-Marne